Saint-Marcouf is a commune in the Manche department in Normandy in north-western France.

Second World War
During the Second World War, a German coastal battery near the village was bombed but fired on Allied forces landing on Utah Beach on D-Day and again on 8 June before being silenced by US battleships.

Heraldry

See also
Communes of the Manche department

References

Saintmarcouf